The Ukrainian World is a general social term, a figure of language to denote some associative connection with Ukrainian culture.

Ukrainian World in Ukrainian Studies 
The Ukrainian world is a cognitive metaphor, a metaphysical concept in Ukrainian studies is abstracted and derived (generalized) by certain features of the concept of ontological reality, united in its integrity by certain sociocultural, ethnonational, socio-historical, geoeconomic, geopolitical features. The expression is one of the main concepts included in the structure of the subject field of Ukrainian studies ontological thought in the philosophical study of the theory of "what exists and how it exists", along with the concepts: "Ukrainians", "Ukrainianness", "Ukrainian man", "Ukraine", "Ukrainian society", "Ukrainian nature", "Ukrainian culture","universal civilization", etc. Ukraine and world Ukrainianness together - the "all-planet Ukrainian World" — "is an object, a source, an image and an analogue of the destiny of Ukrainian studies." The Ukrainian world is a cognitive metaphor that defines the specifics of the fundamental path of Ukrainian human existence in the world and the culture that is objectified in metaculture on its basis, which is based on the interaction of Ukrainian worldview, which was created and transformed over millennia and today represents the essence of being and consciousness of Ukrainians as a nation.

The object of Ukrainian studies is the real Ukrainian world, which was created and transformed over millennia and today represents the essence of existence and consciousness of Ukrainians as a nation. This is an ontological reality, united in its integrity by certain socio-cultural, ethno-national, socio-historical, geoeconomic, geopolitical features. The defining categorical characteristics of the Ukrainian world are the integrity, universality, originality, self-sufficiency, self-development, unity and intermediacy of all its dimensions.

In essence, the Ukrainian World is a common "civilizational space" of world Ukrainians (Ukraine plus world Ukrainians), designed to expand Ukraine's geopolitical presence in the world and the realization of Ukraine's national interests through international integration and cooperation. Fundamentals of the Ukrainian World, emphasized by various authors: spirituality and the state, Ukrainian culture and the Ukrainian language, national economy and developed social sphere, Ukrainian science and technology.

Ukrainians living in different countries of the world (diaspora) according to Ukrainian legislation have the status of a foreign Ukrainian, according to various estimates from 12 to 20 million people — communicating in Ukrainian at home, with colleagues at work, uniting by interests in : circles, artistic groups, public organizations, religious associations, opening and founding: educational institutions, mass media, churches, monasteries, museums, libraries, cultural centers, cultural monuments, etc. — create the Ukrainian World. Their status and principles of activity are regulated by the national legislation of the host country and normative legal acts of Ukraine.

Some views on the Ukrainian world 

 His Holiness Sviatoslav, Supreme Archbishop of Kyiv and Halych, Metropolitan of Kyiv, Primate of the Ukrainian Greek Catholic Church:

 The First President of Ukraine Leonid Kravchuk on the Ukrainian and Russian worlds:

 Ukrainian politician and public figure, Head of the Security Service of Ukraine Valentyn Nalyvaichenko

 The Fifth President of Ukraine Petro Poroshenko on the identity of the Ukrainian people:

 Chairman of the Verkhovna Rada Andrii Parubii in greeting the Ukrainian people since 2017:

Education, language, culture and traditions in the Ukrainian world 
Individuals who belong to the Ukrainian World have the opportunity to join the Ukrainian culture and art, learn the Ukrainian language, customs and traditions of Ukrainians, as well as receive Ukrainian education regardless of their place of residence.

Children of citizens and residents of Ukraine have the opportunity to receive general secondary education in a network of secondary schools located in Ukraine.

Children of residents of other countries have the opportunity to obtain primary, basic and complete general secondary education in Ukraine at the International Ukrainian School by distance learning methods. The International Ukrainian School, in cooperation with a network of Ukrainian schools abroad, also combines distance and / or full-time teaching methods. Training in these methods provides an opportunity to obtain official documents of the Ukrainian model, which certify the educational levels of each student. Children of Ukrainian citizens temporarily living abroad have the opportunity to study for free. Children of Ukrainian citizens living in the occupied territories of Luhansk and Donetsk oblasts and the Crimea also have the same opportunity.

In addition, both in Ukraine and abroad, there is a network of international schools where students have the opportunity to participate in Ukrainian culture and art, to study the Ukrainian language and literature, as well as to obtain official documents on educational levels in language and literature levels of relevant requirements of the international bachelor's degree. If students do not want to obtain educational documents, but study the language and literature "for themselves", the level of knowledge they receive is not assessed, official documents are not issued.

The network of Ukrainian educational institutions outside Ukraine provides an opportunity to join the Ukrainian culture and art, study the Ukrainian language, customs and traditions of Ukrainians almost all over the world. These are usually Saturday or Sunday schools or schools that work part-time or optional. After the opening of the International Ukrainian School, some of them have established or are establishing cooperation to obtain the opportunity to provide educational levels and state-standard documents for Ukrainian general secondary education.

Ukrainian world in literature and art 

 Mykola Gogol's Ukrainian world in the story "Evening against Ivan Kupala"
 Aesthetic world of Ukrainians in the national literary heritage
 "Ukrainian World" - exhibitions of works by Volodymyr Dziubenko. 2011
 "Ukrainian world" in artifacts and masterpieces. Ukraine Young. Number 127 for 30.08.2012

See also 
 Greater Ukraine

Sources 

 Конституція України. Ст. 11,12. 
 Перелік документів для оформлення статусу закордонного українця
 Закон України про правовий статус закордонних українців
 Діаспора будує Український Світ
 Український Простір
 Український Світ. Фейсбук.
 Проект «УКРАЇНЦІ В СВІТІ»
 Український Світ у соціальних мережах
 Перелік документів для оформлення статусу закордонного українця
 Закон України про правовий статус закордонних українців
 Віктор Рибаченко («Час і Події»). Український світ: проблеми побудови.
 Віталій Абліцов. Будувати Український Світ
 Олександр Пономарів. Творити український світ!
 Брама в Український Світ
 Заступник Голови Верховної Ради України Микола Томенко про «Український Світ» в Україні.
 Програма курсу «Український світ» для учителів недільних (суботніх) шкіл українського зарубіжжя
 Володимир Білецький. Це ми, Плането, — українці.
 «Украинский мир»: Украина и ее диаспора
 Мені мила українська мова і мій український світ
 Про «український світ» у світі
 Вибрані наукові матеріали Донецького вісника Наукового Товариства ім. Шевченка та інформаційно-аналітичного журналу «Схід»
 Ukrainian World
 Д. В. Табачник, Г. Д. Попов Українці зарубіжжя та Україна. Довідник. Київ 2007

References 

 Notes

 Bibliography

Ukrainian diaspora
Public policy